Thomas Paterson (26 October 1874 – 11 September 1945) was an Australian rules footballer who played with Collingwood in the Victorian Football League (VFL).

Notes

External links 

Tom Paterson's profile at Collingwood Forever

1874 births
1945 deaths
Australian rules footballers from Victoria (Australia)
Collingwood Football Club players